Makuach is a  Payam in Bor Central County, in Jonglei State, South Sudan.  It is situated on the east side of the  Bahr al Jabal River.  Bor town borders Makuach to the west,  Baidit Payam to the north, and  Anyidi Payam to the south.

Demographics
Makuach is composed of four bomas:  Kapat, Konbek, Makuach, Madiing Boma and Werkok.  According to the Fifth Population and Housing Census of Sudan, conducted in April 2008, Makuach had a combined population of 29,412 people, composed of 15,251 male and 14,161 female residents.

Makuach is home to four major communities.  These are Koch, Deer, Ater, Madiing and Adumuor.

Landmarks

A huge church called Dhion (Zion), which is often cited as the largest grass-roofed structure ever built in South Sudan, is located at Pakayo (or Pakeo), a site between the Werekok and Kapat boma centers.  Construction of the church was begun in 1992 by participants in a popular Christian-conversion movement led by Paul Kon Adjith, who is buried in the church compound. Marc Nikkel visited the site in 1994 and described it like this:

Notes

References 

Geography of South Sudan
Jonglei State
Subdivisions of South Sudan